Neumünster is a city in the middle of Schleswig-Holstein, Germany. With more than 79,000 registered inhabitants, it is the fourth-largest municipality in Schleswig-Holstein (behind Kiel, Lübeck and Flensburg). The Holstenhallen and the Stadthalle make the city an important trade fair location.

History
The city was first formally mentioned as Wippendorp im Gau Faldera in 1127. In that year, the Bishop Vicelinus was sent there by the Archbishop of Bremen to perform missionary work. By 1136, Vicelinus built a new monastery there (Latin: novum monasterium, Greco-Latin: Neomonasterium, German: neues Kloster or neues Münster). The name "Novum monasterium" eventually replaced the previous names of Wippendorf and Faldera and led to the current name.

In April 1870, Neumünster received town privileges. Since 1903 Neumünster is a so-called "independent city" (German: Kreisfreie Stadt) as it is not part of a district (German: Kreis).

Großflecken (English: Large spot), a large, centrally-located street and public space in the city, became a place for civil unrest several times. In March 1848, riots broke out at Großflecken as part of the German revolution and again in 1923 during a period of inflation.

The city was protested by the Rural People's Movement as part of a farmers' protest movement in northern Germany from 1928 to 1933, which was the basis for Hans Fallada's novel A Small Circus (Bauern, Bonzen und Bomben). The city's Hans Fallada Prize is named after him.

The Schleswig-Holstein Nazi Party was founded in 1925 by Hinrich Lohse. The local Nazi Party group of Neumünster met at Hofbräu München, a brewery at Großflecken. In 1926, Joseph Goebbels spoke to the local members there. In 1929 there were reportedly 29 members of the local Nazi Party group, but this number increased to 400 members a year later and to over 2,000 members by 1932. Shortly after the Nazi seizure of power, Großflecken was renamed to Adolf-Hitler-Platz (English: Adolf Hitler Place). On Kristallnacht in 1938, all Jewish men were arrested and sent to KZ Sachsenhausen.

During World War 2, Neumünster was bombed multiple times by Allied forces in 1945, partly because of its importance as a railway junction and industrial city. The British took control of the City in May 1945.

In the fall of 1946, the state of Schleswig-Holstein was founded and post-war Neumünster held its first municipal election.

Neumünster used to be a hub for the textile industry, with its first fulling mill going back to 1566. However, the industry eventually left the city due to competition from overseas and Neumünster's last cloth factory closed in the beginning of the 1990s. This, among other reasons, has led to Neumünster having a relatively high rate of unemployment in recent decades compared to nationwide averages.

In 2012, McArthurGlen Group opened a designer outlet shopping center in the industrial section of the city, using approximately 15,000 square meters.

Current infrastructure
The city is divided into nine neighborhoods: Böcklersiedlung-Bugenhagen, Brachenfeld-Rutenberg, Einfeld, Faldera, Gadeland, Gartenstadt, Stadtmitte, Tungendorf and Wittorf.

Neumünster station is a major railway junction with lines running in six (formerly seven) directions, including the important Hamburg-Altona–Kiel and Neumünster–Flensburg lines.

Near Neumünster at Ehndorf, there is a high-power medium wave transmission facility for transmitting the programmes of Deutschlandfunk, the Ehndorf transmitter, which is often named incorrectly as "Neumünster transmitter".

The city has an airfield and a hospital. The utility company, "Stadtwerke Neumünster" (SWN), also manages local inter-city bus routes. In 2022, SWN ended all its inter-city bus service for Sundays and holidays, instead offering an on-demand shuttle van requiring an additional "comfort surcharge" on top of regular bus fares.

Education 
The University of Applied Sciences Kiel offers a bachelor's degree in nursing at its Neumünster site.

Geography

The Aukrug Nature Park is close to the town.

Culture and Sightseeing

Museums and artists' house 
The Museum Tuch + Technik shows the history of the cloth-making craft from the Iron Age to the present day as well as of the city of Neumünster. The museum, which is supported by the Foundation Museum, Art and Culture of the City of Neumünster, was reopened on October 13, 2007 with a revised exhibition in a specially constructed building.

The Herbert Gerisch Foundation is an art foundation established in 2001 by Brigitte and Herbert Gerisch and based in Neumünster-Brachenfeld. The foundation serves the care, promotion and presentation of regional as well as international contemporary art. At the same time as the foundation was established, an international sculpture park was continuously built up.

The Keramikkünstlerhaus Neumünster (until 2022 Stadttöpferei Neumünster) is an artists' house in Neumünster, which has been awarding work and residency scholarships for outstanding international graduates in the field of artistic ceramics since 1987. The Keramikkünstlerhaus is located in the Fürsthof, a small street in Neumünster's historic city center. The three-story brick building was built around 1900.

Zoo 
The Tierpark Neumünster houses about 700 animals from a total of 100 species of mammals, birds and reptiles on a wooded area of 24 hectares.

Nature reserves 
The raised bog Dosenmoor near Einfeld northeast of Neumünster has an area of 521 hectares and is the largest and best preserved raised bog in Schleswig-Holstein. Due to the good condition of the moor, a diverse flora and fauna can be explored here.

The nature reserve on the western shore of Einfelder See protects the near-natural shoreline landscape with siltation zones and the open water areas in front of them.

Politics

Mayor
The current mayor of Neumünster is Tobias Bergmann of the Social Democratic Party (SPD). The most recent mayoral election was held on 9 May 2021, with a runoff held on 30 May, and the results were as follows:

! rowspan=2 colspan=2| Candidate
! rowspan=2| Party
! colspan=2| First round
! colspan=2| Second round
|-
! Votes
! %
! Votes
! %
|-
| bgcolor=| 
| align=left| Olaf Taurus
| align=left| Independent (CDU)
| 10,315
| 40.6
| 9,857
| 49.2
|-
| bgcolor=| 
| align=left| Tobias Bergmann
| align=left| Social Democratic Party
| 6,834
| 26.9
| 10,194
| 50.8
|-
| bgcolor=| 
| align=left| Sven Radestock
| align=left| Alliance 90/The Greens
| 5,649
| 22.3
|-
| bgcolor=| 
| align=left| Memet Celik
| align=left| Independent
| 1,799
| 7.1
|-
| bgcolor=| 
| align=left| Mark Proch
| align=left| National Democratic Party
| 786
| 3.1
|-
! colspan=3| Valid votes
! 25,383
! 99.1
! 20,051
! 99.4
|-
! colspan=3| Invalid votes
! 233
! 0.9
! 112
! 0.6
|-
! colspan=3| Total
! 25,616
! 100.0
! 20,163
! 100.0
|-
! colspan=3| Electorate/voter turnout
! 64,345
! 39.8
! 64,344
! 31.3
|-
| colspan=7| Source: City of Neumünster (1st round, 2nd round)
|}

List of mayors and Lord mayors
In 1870 Neumünster received the town privileges.
 1870–1894: Eduard Schlichting
 1894–1919: Max Röer
 1919–1933: Detlef Schmidt
 1933–1945: Max Stahmer (NSDAP (Nazi Party))
 1945–1946: Gustav Bärwald (Oberstadtdirektor)
 1946–1948: Ludolf Behnke (CDU)
 1948–1950: Hugo Voß (SPD)
 1950–1970: Walther Lehmkuhl (SPD)
 1970–1988: Uwe Harder (SPD)
 1988–1991: Franz-Josef Pröpper (SPD)
 1991–2009: Hartmut Unterlehberg (SPD)
 2009–2021: Olaf Tauras (CDU)
2021–present: Tobias Bergmann (SPD)

City council
The Neumünster city council governs the city alongside the Mayor. The most recent city council election was held on 6 May 2018, and the results were as follows:

! colspan=2| Party
! Votes
! %
! +/-
! Seats
! +/-
|-
| bgcolor=| 
| align=left| Christian Democratic Union (CDU)
| 7,665
| 34.0
|  2.5
| 15
|  1
|-
| bgcolor=| 
| align=left| Social Democratic Party (SPD)
| 6,163
| 27.4
|  6.6
| 12
|  2
|-
| bgcolor=| 
| align=left| Alliance 90/The Greens (Grüne)
| 3,686
| 16.4
|  3.9
| 7
|  2
|-
| bgcolor=| 
| align=left| Free Democratic Party (FDP)
| 1,318
| 5.9
|  1.7
| 2
|  1
|-
| 
| align=left| Alliance for Citizens in Schleswig-Holstein (BfB)
| 1,293
| 5.7
|  0.4
| 2
| ±0
|-
| bgcolor=| 
| align=left| The Left (Die Linke)
| 959
| 4.3
|  1.3
| 2
|  1
|-
| bgcolor=| 
| align=left| National Democratic Party (NPD)
| 879
| 3.9
|  2.3
| 2
|  1
|-
| bgcolor=| 
| align=left| Liberal Conservative Reformers (LKR)
| 440
| 2.0
| New
| 1
| New
|-
| colspan=7 bgcolor=lightgrey|
|-
| bgcolor=| 
| align=left| Pirate Party Germany (Piraten)
| 120
| 0.5
|  1.5
| 0
|  1
|-
! colspan=2| Valid votes
! 22,523
! 98.8
! 
! 
! 
|-
! colspan=2| Invalid votes
! 263
! 1.2
! 
! 
! 
|-
! colspan=2| Total
! 22,786
! 100.0
! 
! 43
! ±0
|-
! colspan=2| Electorate/voter turnout
! 64,839
! 35.1
!  4.7
! 
! 
|-
| colspan=7| Source: City of Neumünster
|}

Population development

Twin towns – sister cities

Neumünster is twinned with:
 Gravesham, England, United Kingdom
 Koszalin, Poland
 Parchim, Germany

Notable people

Vicelinus (1086–1154), Apostle of Holstein and Bishop of Oldenburg
Ernst Eduard Hudemann (1811–1889), educator, philologist and classical historian
Eduard Sachau (1845–1930), orientalist
Rudolf Bülck (1880−1954), librarian
Karl Schlabow (1891–1984), archaeologist, museum director and conservator 
Walter Bartram (1893–1971), former Minister President of Schleswig-Holstein
Hans Schnoor (1893–1976), musicologist
Fritz C. Mauch (1905–1940), film editor and assistant director
Eduard Müller (1911–1943), Catholic priest, one of the Lübeck martyrs
Herbert Martin Hagen (1913–1999), SS Stormbolder and convicted war criminal
Annemarie Auer (1913–2002), author and literary scholar
Gerhard Wessel (1913–2002), President of the Federal Intelligence Bureau 1968–1978
Horst Mittelstaedt (1923–2016), biologist cyberneticist and university lecturer
Detlev Blanke (1941–2016), University lecturer for interlinguistics at the Humboldt-Universität Berlin
Michael Simon (born 1958), theatre director, opera director and scenic designer
Thomas Mohr (tenor) (born 1961), tenor and academic teacher
Christine Haderthauer (born 1962), former CSU General Secretary and former Minister of State (Bavarian State Ministry of Labor and Social Affairs, Family and Women)
Aminata Touré (born 1992), German Green Party politician, member and former Vice-President of the Schleswig-Holstein Landtag and current Minister of Social Affairs, Youth, Family, Senior Citizens, Integration and Equality of Schleswig-Holstein

Sport 
Wilf Smith (born 1946), English footballer
Werner Bühse (born 1951), sports shooter
Svenja Schlicht (born 1967), swimmer
Dirk Urban (born 1969), shot putter
Stefan Schnoor (born 1971), footballer
Gabriel Silberstein (born 1974), Chilean tennis player
Mona Barthel (born 1990), tennis player

See also
VfR Neumünster
Hans Fallada Prize
Einfelder See

References

External links

 Official website

 
Towns in Schleswig-Holstein